Boccia at the 2018 Asian Para Games in Jakarta was held between 10 and 12 October 2018.

Medal table

Medalists

References

External links
 Boccia - Asian Para Games 2018
 RESULT SYSTEM - ASIAN PARA GAMES JAKARTA 2018

2018 Asian Para Games events